La Chica de Rojo is the debut studio album by Chilean singer Monserrat Bustamante (later known as Mon Laferte), released on July 12, 2003 through Warner Music Chile. Some of the hits included in the album are: "Corazón Bandido", "Yo sin tu amor", "Dos locos" and "Maldita Ignorancia". The album was number one in Chile and was certified Platinum + Gold in Chile just a month after its release.

Background 
The album was released due to the TV series Rojo: Fama Contrafama, which was intended to satisfy her followers with these cover songs. La Chica de Rojo raised Bustamante popularity throughout Chile, reaching number one in albums sales in Chile and being certified Platinum + Gold in Chile just a month after its release.

Track listing

Personnel 
Credits adapted from La Chica de Rojo notes.

Vocals

 Monserrat Bustamante – lead vocals
Santos Chavez – lead vocals (track 5)
Juan David Rodríguez – lead vocals (track 9)
Marcela Trujillo – background vocals
Daniel Donoso – background vocals

Musicians

 Carlos Figueroa –  drums
 C. Villagra – drums (track 8)
 Cristián Gálvez – bass guitar (track 1, 2, 3, 5, 6, 9)
 Leo Ahumada – bass guitar (track 4, 7, 8, 10)
 Gige Vidal – arrangement, piano, keyboards
 Claudio Prado – piano, keyboards (track 3)

Design

 Carolina Escobar Moragas – design

Production

 Gáspar Domínguez – executive production
Jaime Román – production, mixing
Gige Vidal – production
Walter Romero – production, recording, mixing
Carolina Scipioni – production, coordination
Cristina Nunez – production, coordination
Cecilia Tassara – production, coordination
José Manuel Salinas M. – recording assistance
Ximena Montenegro C. – recording assistance, mixing assistance
Miguel Bahamonde – mastering

Recording

 Recorded at Estudios Sonus, Santiago de Chile

Certifications

References

2003 debut albums
Mon Laferte albums